The Stone Raft is a novel by  Portuguese writer José Saramago. It was written in 1986, and was translated into English by Giovanni Pontiero in 1994. The premise of the novel is that the Iberian Peninsula has broken off the European continent and is floating freely in the Atlantic Ocean; bureaucrats around the world are forced to deal with the traumatic effects, while five characters from across Portugal and Spain are drawn ever closer to one another, embarking on a journey within the peninsula as the landmass journeys itself.

A Spanish-language film version entitled La Balsa de Piedra was released in 2002. A Dutch, Spanish and Portuguese co-production, it was directed by Dutch director George Sluizer. 

In 2021 it came to light that many lyrics of singer-songwriter Noel Gallagher of Oasis bear a strong resemblance to various lines from the novel, leading fans to believe that the book may have served as a device of lyrical inspiration throughout his songwriting career, in particular in the 1996 song 'Underneath The Sky'.

References

1986 novels
20th-century Portuguese novels
Novels by José Saramago
Novels set in Portugal
Novels set in Spain
Portuguese novels adapted into films